Jamshaid Khan Mohmand (born; 3 February 1973) is a Pakistani Independent politician hailing from Mardan District. Mohmand is currently serving as Member of the Khyber Pakhtunkhwa Assembly. He is also serving as committee chairman and member of the different committees.

Early life and education
Mohmand was born on 3 February 1973 in Mardan District. He got his MSc degree in International relations.

Political career
Mohmand was elected as the member of the Khyber Pakhtunkhwa Assembly as Independent from PK-27 (Mardan-V) in by-polls election held in August 2013 following the seat fell vacant after the assassination of his brother Imran Khan Mohmand on 18 June 2013.

References

1973 births
Living people
Pashtun people
Khyber Pakhtunkhwa MPAs 2013–2018
People from Mardan District
Independent politicians in Pakistan